Gian Giacomo Gallarati Scotti (2 September 1886 – 4 January 1983) was an Italian politician. He was the 5th podestà of Milan. He was a recipient of the Order of Saints Maurice and Lazarus.

References

1886 births
1983 deaths
People from Vimercate
Members of the Senate of the Kingdom of Italy
20th-century Italian politicians
Mayors of Milan
Recipients of the Order of Saints Maurice and Lazarus